Francisco Benítez Esbri (born 13 October 1970) is a Spanish former road cyclist, who was professional from 1993 to 1999. He rode in two editions of the Tour de France and two of the Vuelta a España.

Major results
1993
 9th Overall Volta ao Algarve
1997
 2nd Overall Vuelta a Mexico
1st Stage 10
 2nd Trofeo Serra de Tramuntana
 2nd Overall Vuelta a Mallorca

References

1970 births
Living people
Spanish male cyclists
Cyclists from the Valencian Community
People from La Vall d'Uixó
Sportspeople from the Province of Castellón